Pollitt is a surname, and may refer to:

 Alice Pollitt (1929–2016), American baseball player
 George Pollitt (1874–unknown), English cricketer
 Harry Pollitt (1890–1960), trade unionist, General Secretary of the Communist Party of Great Britain
 Harry Pollitt (engineer) (1864–1945), British locomotive engineer
 Herbert Charles Pollitt (also known as Jerome Pollitt) (1871-1942), British arts patron and female impersonator.
 James Pollitt (1826–1860), English cricketer
 James Pollitt (priest) (1813–1881), Anglican minister in South Australia
 Katha Pollitt (born 1949), American poet, essayist and critic
 Mike Pollitt (born 1972), English footballer
 Tessa Pollitt (born 1959), punk musician
 Tom Pollitt (1900–1979), English cricketer and Royal Air Force officer
 William Pollitt, British railway manager (1842–1908)

Fictional characters
Big Daddy Pollitt and all his family, characters in Cat on a Hot Tin Roof